Frigyes Ákos Hazslinszky or in German version of his name Friedrich August Hazslinszky von Hazslin (Késmárk Kingdom of Hungary, Austrian Empire, 6 January 1818 – Eperjes, Kingdom of Hungary, Austria-Hungary 16 September 1896) was a Hungarian mycologist and botanist. Upon completing his lyceum studies  in Késmark (today Kežmarok, Slovakia), he studied philosophy, law, theology and chemistry, working concurrently as a teacher. After a stint as teacher in Debrecen and Sárospatak, and further studies in Vienna, he became professor of  physics and mathematic at the Lutheran College in Eperjes (today Prešov) in 1846. 

His scientific interests and contributions centered on the then Northern Hungarian – now Slovakian - flora, in particular the one of the Szepesség, Orava and the Tatra Mountains.  Hazslinszky published extensively in botany, pteridology and particularly in mycology. He published the first Hungarian plant identification guide in 1864 as well as over a hundred, mostly mycological papers and monographs, among them the monumental  Beiträge zur Kenntniss der Flora der Karpathen in 9 parts. 

He was a full member of the Hungarian Academy of Sciences. 

The genus Hazslinszkya was named in his honour by Gustav Wilhelm Körber in 1861.

Some taxa commemorating Hazslinszky 
 Sapindus Hazslinszkyi Ett.
 Ficus Hazslinszkyii Ett. 
 Cedrella Hazslinszkyi Ung. 
 Ranina Hazslinszkyi Reuss; 
 Hazslinszkya gibberulosa Körber, 
 Peziza Hazslinszkyi Cooke,  
 Cryptospora Hazslinszkyi Rehm. 
 Agaricus Hazslinszkyi Schulzer

Publications 
 Complete bibliography on Worldcat

References 

 Z. Radwańska-Paryska, W. H. Paryski: Wielka encyklopedia tatrzańska, Wydawnictwo górskie, Poronin 1995., 403-404. 
 Karpatendeutsches biographisches Lexikon. Stuttgart 1988, . 
 Baráthová, N. & al. Osobnosti Kežmarku 1206 – 2009. Jadro 2009

External links 
 Biography on Cybertruffle	
 Biography in Magyar Életrajzi Lexikon
 Biography in Hungarian

1818 births
1896 deaths
People from Kežmarok
Hungarians in Slovakia
19th-century Hungarian botanists
Hungarian mycologists